The 1996–97 season was the 99th season of competitive football played by Arsenal. The club dismissed manager Bruce Rioch in the close season, who spent a year in-charge. After much speculation, Frenchman Arsène Wenger was appointed as his replacement – the club's first manager born outside of the British Isles. At the end of the campaign, Arsenal finished third in the Premier League and missed out on UEFA Champions League qualification. They made exits in the fourth round of both the FA Cup and Football League Cup to Leeds United and Liverpool respectively. In Europe, the club were eliminated in the UEFA Cup first round to Borussia Mönchengladbach of Germany.

Arsenal sold several fringe players in the transfer window, notably David Hillier to Portsmouth and Paul Dickov to Manchester City. Midfielders Rémi Garde and Patrick Vieira were purchased from RC Strasbourg and Milan respectively. John Hartson moved to West Ham United in January 1997; he was replaced in the squad by teenager Nicolas Anelka, who joined Arsenal a month later from Paris Saint-Germain.

A strong start to their league campaign, with one defeat in their first 12 matches saw Arsenal begin November in first spot. Although the club were winless during the Christmas period, their chances of winning the title remained intact. A run of two draws and losses in February was more severe, as it moved Arsenal down to fourth spot. Draws in April prompted Wenger to rule his team out of the title race and make priority to second spot, which came with a qualifying spot for the Champions League. Defeat to Newcastle United in the penultimate game of the season all but ended Arsenal's chances of finishing second, given Newcastle's superior goal difference. A win on the final day against Derby County meant the club finished third, level on points with Newcastle and Liverpool.

28 different players represented the club in four competitions and there were 12 different goalscorers. Ian Wright was Arsenal's top goalscorer of the season; he scored 30 goals in 41 appearances.

Background

In June 1995, Arsenal appointed Bruce Rioch, who had just guided Bolton Wanderers to the League Cup final and promotion to the top flight, as manager. Under his stewardship, the club broke the English transfer record by paying Internazionale £7.5million for Dutch striker Dennis Bergkamp and the new signing formed an impressive partnership with Ian Wright. Arsenal reached the League Cup semi-finals and finished fifth in the Premier League at the end of 1995–96, securing a place in the following season's UEFA Cup.

Managerial changes
A week before the start of the league season, Arsenal sacked manager Rioch and cited the decision was in the "best long-term interest of the club". It was alleged that a dispute over transfer funds with the board of directors prompted his departure; his relationship moreover with David Dein according to an insider was "no longer cordial". Stewart Houston was once again put in temporary charge, with Pat Rice serving as first team coach. Johan Cruyff was considered the favourite for the job;Terry Venables and David O'Leary were other names linked to the managerial position. Houston put his name forward for the job, but upon being told that he would not be considered, resigned to take over as manager of Division One side Queens Park Rangers, leaving Rice as the team's second caretaker manager of the season. Arsenal would eventually select Frenchman Arsène Wenger as their next manager, but did not officially announce his appointment until September 1996, once his contract with Japanese club Nagoya Grampus Eight was terminated by mutual consent. He became Arsenal's 19th and highest-paid manager, on a three-year, £2 million contract.

Transfers

In

Out

Pre-season

Source:

Premier League

August–October

Arsenal began their league campaign on 17 August 1996, at home to West Ham United. Three minutes before the half-hour, Hartson gave Arsenal the lead, after his initial shot came back off the post, for a tap-in. West Ham conceded a penalty in the second half when Marc Rieper handled Lee Dixon's cross; Bergkamp, in the absence of designated penalty taker Wright, struck the ball low to Luděk Mikloško's right to score the team's second goal. Arsenal suffered their first loss of the league season two days later away to Liverpool; Steve McManaman scored twice in six second half minutes. The team responded with a 2–0 win at Leicester City in a game where Wright started as a substitute but scored the decisive goal. A 3–3 draw with Chelsea in the first week of September was described as "outstanding" by Houston after the team had recovered from a two-goal half-time deficit. Although Linighan scored an injury time equaliser for Arsenal against Aston Villa, The Guardian match report suggested their most obvious problem in the match was "...despite Merson's valiant efforts, a lack of invention in midfield". Wright scored a hat-trick against Sheffield Wednesday on 16 September 1996, to record 100 league goals for Arsenal. The game marked the debut of Patrick Vieira, who came on as a substitute for Ray Parlour. Goals by Hartson and Wright earned the team victory against Middlesbrough, then the team won a third consecutive match – at home to Sunderland – to draw level on points with league leaders Liverpool.

Wenger's first match in charge of Arsenal was against winless Blackburn Rovers on 12 October 1996. Two goals, both scored by Wright, extended Arsenal's winning league run to four matches and helped consolidate their position. A goalless draw at home to Coventry City was marred by an incident involving Wright and Coventry goalkeeper Steve Ogrizovic that resulted in the latter having a broken nose. October concluded with a home fixture against Leeds United; a 3–0 win for Arsenal marked defeat for former manager George Graham, who made his managerial return to Highbury. The team ended the month joint top of the table with Newcastle United, both on 24 points having played 11 games.

November–February
Arsenal's first fixture of November was against Wimbledon. Wright gave Arsenal the lead after six minutes, only for Vinnie Jones to head in the equaliser close to half-time. Merson scored Arsenal's second, but Marcus Gayle replied immediately, "bund[ling] the ball past (David) Seaman". An own goal by Nigel Winterburn against Manchester United ended the champions' run of three matches without a win and extended a barren run of Arsenal failing to score at Old Trafford since the creation of the Premier League. Wenger told the press he was not despondent about his first defeat as Arsenal manager: "Obviously, the way we lost was difficult to accept, but I'm happy with the way we played. Our organisation was excellent, we kept fighting and I am very optimistic for the future." Attention soon turned to the North London derby, where Arsenal faced Tottenham Hotspur on 24 November 1996. Arsenal had not beaten their neighbours in over three years and Tottenham were unbeaten at Highbury since September 1991. The match had ramifications in the league: a win potentially placed Arsenal in a position to move into first spot, if other results went in their favour. In the match, Wright put Arsenal into the lead through a penalty, but after 57 minutes, Sol Campbell headed on a long throw for Tottenham and the ball fell to Andy Sinton, whose shot "cannoned off the inside of the near post, then hit Lukic on the head and rebounded into the net". Two minutes before the 90-minute mark, Tony Adams scored the winner, and in injury time, Bergkamp added a third: he controlled a high ball with his left foot and evaded his marker Stephen Carr in a tight area to shoot. A 2–1 win against title challengers Newcastle United, having played three-quarters of the match with ten men, moved Arsenal back to the top of the table.

Arsenal moved three points clear at the top of the Premier League with a 3–1 win at home to Southampton in early December. Against Derby County, Vieira scored his first goal for the club to earn Arsenal a point. The team then faced Nottingham Forest, which marked Stuart Pearce's debut as caretaker manager. Arsenal, without Seaman, Adams, Dixon and Vieira, succumbed to a 2–1 defeat, following the dismissal of Wright. The poor form over Christmas continued: Arsenal were held to a goalless draw away to Sheffield Wednesday on Boxing Day and twice let their lead against Aston Villa slip, in spite of playing "...the best 45 minutes of football the Premiership has seen this season." On New Year's Day, Wright scored his 200th English league goal in Arsenal's 2–0 win against Middlesbrough; he began a three-game suspension thereafter, because of his red card against Nottingham Forest. Disciplinary problems continued to beset the club: Bergkamp's dismissal in the team's defeat to Sunderland on 11 January 1997 was Arsenal's fifth in ten matches. Wenger admitted the disciplinary record was in danger of damaging their title challenge, adding, "The other strange fact is that three out of five dismissals have been strikers, when that sort of thing normally happens to defenders. To me, that shows our strikers must be taking their fair share of kicks. When teams play Arsenal, the games are physical and we have to defend ourselves." Arsenal kept up with Manchester United and Liverpool with a win over Everton on 19 January 1997; the result kept them three points behind top spot with a game in hand. At Upton Park, the team recorded their sixth victory in seven visits to West Ham and moved second, behind "the advancing Manchester United".

February saw Arsenal's title challenge take a turn for the worse, as the team went on a four-match winless run. Back-to-back draws against Leeds United and Tottenham Hotspur was followed by defeat to Manchester United. In the latter match, television footage showed Wright aiming a two-footed challenge on opposition goalkeeper Peter Schmeichel, who was advancing to gather the ball in his half. The police stepped in to keep the players apart after the final whistle and informed the referee of the incident, which was to be later included in his report. Wright protested his innocence and complained he was subject to racial abuse by Schmeichel, at which point the FA intervened and met with representatives of both clubs. Both players eventually agreed to end their feud and, by April, released statements highlighting this. The month ended with a home defeat to Wimbledon, which prompted Wenger to rule out their championship hopes: "'Yes, for the title of course,' he replied when asked if the result had ended the team's interest in the Premiership, 'but for Europe, no.'" After 28 games, Arsenal were in fourth position, having played two more games than Newcastle in third and one more than Manchester United, who were six points clear in first.

March–May

Bergkamp and Wright scored a goal apiece in Arsenal's 2–0 win against Everton on the first day of March. The team won by an identical scoreline at home to Nottingham Forest a week later and then kept a third consecutive clean sheet against Southampton; midfielders Stephen Hughes and Paul Shaw both got themselves on the scoresheet. Defeat at home to Liverpool on 24 March 1997 was marred by a dubious penalty awarded to striker Robbie Fowler. The player himself "stood and mouthed: 'No penalty!'" given Seaman made no contact in the penalty box, but the referee unaltered his decision. Although Fowler's spotkick was later saved, the ball rebounded to Jason McAteer, who scored. Wenger ruled the team out of the title race again by saying after the match, "Everybody knows now that it was not a penalty, but I can understand that a referee took a wrong decision. That's football and it eliminates our chance of the championship."

Wright scored his 27th goal of the season away at Chelsea in the first week of April; it took him seven goals short of breaking Cliff Bastin's career record at Arsenal. A win against Leicester City was Arsenal's fifth league win in six matches and boosted the club's chances of finishing second, which came with a spot in the Champions League. Wenger assessed that it was "not impossible to win the title", adding "but when you see Manchester United winning again, realistically you would like to be in their position." A last-minute equaliser for Blackburn Rovers against Arsenal on 19 April 1997 was controversial given the manner the opposition had scored; with Hughes cramped, Vieira kicked the ball out in order for his teammate to be treated. It was anticipated that, "by the game's conventions", Blackburn should have thrown the ball back unchallenged, but striker Chris Sutton forced a corner. The result prompted Wenger to rule out any chance of winning the league: "The best team [Manchester United] has won. But the race for second place is still open and for many weeks I have thought that was the best we could achieve." A further draw against Coventry City, who were fighting to stay another season in the top-flight, moved Arsenal to within four points of Manchester United. They had, however, played two games more than the incumbent champions and one more than Liverpool, sitting in third. Robbie Elliott scored the winner for Newcastle United against Arsenal on 3 May 1997, which reignited their chances of finishing second. Arsenal ended their league campaign against Derby County, who staged their final match at the Baseball Ground. In spite of winning by three goals to one, having played with ten men for the majority of the game, they missed out on second by goal difference to Newcastle.

Match results

Classification

Results summary

Results by round

FA Cup

Arsenal entered the competition in the third round, by virtue of their Premier League status. Their opening match was a score draw against Sunderland, which highlighted the team's shortcomings in attack, as Wright was out of the side. In the replay staged at Roker Park, Bergkamp scored the opener early in the second half, in what he described as "...not only a beautiful goal, it was an important goal". The player received the ball from Merson and with the Sunderland defence closing in, twice dragged the ball with his studs, before curling it beyond goalkeeper Lionel Pérez' reach. Hughes increased the team's lead on the hour mark, by heading the ball in at the far post; it was his first goal at senior level. Arsenal exited the cup in the fourth round, with defeat to fellow Premier League side Leeds United. Striker Rod Wallace scored the only goal of the match.

Football League Cup

Together with the other clubs playing in European competitions, Arsenal entered the Football League Cup in the third round. The team were drawn to face First Division Stoke City, on the week of 21 October 1996. The tie ended 1–1 and was subject to a replay; Wright equalised for Arsenal after Mike Sheron gave Stoke a first half lead. Arsenal won the replay by five goals to two, but exited the cup in the fourth round against league rivals Liverpool – the result marked the first time in four years that Arsenal had conceded four goals. Wenger described Bould's dismissal for a second bookable offence as "hard", before congratulating his opponents: "Liverpool are the best team we have played against since I've been at Arsenal. We didn't deserve to lose to Manchester United but we did deserve to lose to Liverpool."

UEFA Cup

Arsenal entered the UEFA Cup in the first round, a competition which they qualified for by virtue of finishing fifth the previous league season. They were drawn to play German team Borussia Mönchengladbach, twice winners of the cup in the 1970s. In the first leg, staged at Highbury, Arsenal lost Bergkamp through injury before the half-hour; the player was replaced by fellow Dutchman Glenn Helder. Monchengladbach took the lead in the 37th minute, after Peter Nielsen's forward pass met Andrzej Juskowiak, who slipped the ball past an advancing Seaman. Moments after the second half commenced, the away team doubled their lead: captain Stefan Effenberg had taken advantage of Linighan's defensive mistake, which allowed him to shoot. Although Seaman saved the first shot, Effenberg followed up and placed the ball into the top corner of the net. Merson half the deficit in the 54th minute, but Stephan Paßlack increased Monchengladbach's advantage with ten minutes to go; he headed the ball unchallenged past Seaman. Wright scored Arsenal's second goal of the match in stoppage time, on a night where Houston admitted it was "my worst night in Europe".

A fortnight later, Arsenal played the second leg, with Adams returning to the side, deployed in a five-man defence. This did not keep Monchengladbach quiet, for it was they who scored the opening goal, through Juskowiak. Wright replied for Arsenal two minutes before the break and the team brought the aggregate scoreline level, when Merson "pump[ed] home a cracking 25-yard drive into the top right-hand corner." Effenberg equalised, by which point Arsenal had made attacking substitutions to score a third goal. Late in the match, Juskowiak scored his second on the counter, to help Monchengladbach win 6–4 on aggregate score. Wenger, who was in attendance, did not precede over the match officially, but suggested "one or two changes" to caretaker manager and later assistant Pat Rice during the interval.

Squad statistics
Arsenal used a total of 28 players during the 1996–97 season and there were 12 different goalscorers. There were also five squad members who did not make a first-team appearance in the campaign. Bould and Wright featured in 40 matches – the most of any Arsenal player in the campaign; Winterburn started in all 38 league matches. Parlour made the most appearances as a substitute with 15.

The team scored a total of 76 goals in all competitions. The highest scorer was Wright, with 30 goals, followed by Bergkamp who scored 14 goals. Four Arsenal players were sent off during the season: Wright, Bergkamp, Bould and Adams.
Key

No. = Squad number

Pos = Playing position

Nat. = Nationality

Apps = Appearances

GK = Goalkeeper

DF = Defender

MF = Midfielder

FW = Forward

 = Yellow cards

 = Red cards

Numbers in parentheses denote appearances as substitute. Players with number struck through and marked  left the club during the playing season.

Source:

See also

 1996–97 in English football
 List of Arsenal F.C. seasons

References
General

Specific

Arsenal F.C. seasons
Arsenal